Alhassan Dantata (1877 – 17 August 1955) was a Northern Nigerian trader in kola nuts and ground nuts, and he was a distributor of European goods. He supplied large British trading companies with raw materials and also had business interests in the Gold Coast. At the time of his death he was the wealthiest man in West Africa. He is the great-grandfather of Aliko Dangote, the wealthiest person in Nigeria and Africa.

Early life

Parents
Dantata was born 1877 in Bebeji, Kano Emirate in the Sokoto Caliphate, one of several children of Abdullahi and his wife, Amarya. Abdullahi was the son of Baba Talatin, it was Baba Talatin who brought the family from Katsina to Madobi in Kano following the death of his father called Ali, Abdullahi continued to operate from Madobi until 1877, when having set out for a journey to Gonja headquarters of Kola nut trade at Ghana, his wife gave birth to Alhassan at the campsite (Zango) of Bebeji, upon his return from the journey he decided to abandon Madobi for Bebeji. Both his parents were wealthy Agalawa, a hereditary group of long-distance traders in the Hausa empire. Abdullahi died in Bebeji around 1885.

Abdullahi's children were too young to manage his considerable wealth. They all received their portion according to Islamic law when he died. Amarya, like her mother-in-law, was a trader of wealth in her own right. After her husband's death, she decided to leave Bebeji for Ghana, where she had commercial interests. She left the children in Bebeji, in the care of an old slave woman named Tata.

Kano Civil War and slavery
Dantata was still a teenager when the great upheavals occurred in the Kano Emirate from 1893 to 1895. There were two claimants to the Kano Emirate when Emir Muhammad Bello died in 1893.  Tukur was his son. Tukur received his religious training from a Tijaniyya scholar and received the support of the Agalawa. Yusufu had been passed over when Bello became Emir.  Yusufu received his religious training from Qaadiriyya schools. In the resulting civil war, Yusufu forces were victorious over Tukur, and claimed the title of emir. Because of the Agalawa support of Tukur, Dantata and the other Agalawa had their property confiscated and many were captured. Dantata and his brothers were held for ransom, under the threat of slavery. They paid it and Dantata returned to the trading business without his family lands around Kano.

Introduction to trading
Probably after being freed from slavery around 1894, Dantata joined a Gonja-bound caravan to see his mother. He purchased some items in Bebeji, he sold half of them on the way and the rest in Accra. He might have hoped his wealthy mother would allow him to live with her and find him work among the Gold Coast Agalawa community. However, this did not happen. After a rest of only one day, she took him to a mallam and asked Dantata to stay there until he was ready to return to Bebeji. Dantata worked harder in Ghana than he did in Bebeji. After the usual reading of the Qur'an, he had to go and beg for food for his mallam and himself. He worked for money on Thursdays and Fridays. As was the tradition, the bulk of his earnings went to his mallam. At some point he returned to Bebeji to his religious studies and work. There, Tata continued to insist that he must save something every year

Career
Dantata started to be a long-distance trader himself. He remained in Bebeji until matters had settled down. He used the new trade routes to Ibadan and Lagos to develop his network of trading associates.  Instead of bringing kola nuts on pack animals, he used steamships to transport them between Accra, Kumasi, Sekondi and Lagos. He was the first to develop this route. This innovation and contact with Europeans helped establish his wealth and future.

In 1906, he began broadening his interests by trading in beads, necklaces, European cloth, and trade goods. His mother, who had never remarried, died in Accra around 1908.  After her death he focused his attention on new opportunities in Lagos and Kano.

Base of operations
Dantata maintained a house in Bebeji and had no property in the larger trading town of Kano. He did not own a house there, but was satisfied with the accommodation given to him by his patoma (landlord). When the British disposed the successor of Yusufu in 1903, they appointed Abbas as the Emir of Kano. As part of a recompilation, Abbas returned the confiscated lands around Kano to the Agalawa families.  Dantata built his first house in the then empty Sarari area (an extension of Koki) in Kano.

By all accounts, Dantata was hard working, frugal and unpretentious in his personal habits. He was also a good financial manager. He had the good sense to employ Alhaji Babba Na Alhassan who served as his chief accountant and Alhaji Garba Maisikeli as his financial controller for 38 years. Dantata did not manage from behind a desk but involved himself with his workers.

European trading companies
In 1912, when the Europeans started to show an interest in the export of groundnut, they contacted the already established Kano merchants through Emir Abbas and their chief agent, Adamu Jakada. Some established merchants of Kano like Umaru Sharubutu, Maikano Agogo accepted their offer.

Dantata was already familiar with the manner by which traders could make fortunes by buying cocoa for Europeans in the Gold Coast. He had several advantages over other Kano business men: language, wealth and age.  He could speak some English and already had direct dealings with Europeans in Lagos and Accra. He had substantial amounts of capital. Unlike other established Kano merchants, he was in his mid-thirties, with a small family and retinue to support. Despite the famine in Kano in 1914, he quickly dominated the groundnut purchasing business via promotions, loans and contacts.

In 1918, the UK-based Royal Niger Company (later became the United Africa Company) searched for an agent to purchase groundnuts for them, and Dantata responded to their offer. It is said that he used to purchase about half of all the nuts purchased by the United Africa Company in northern Nigeria.

By 1922 Dantata had become the richest businessman in Kano, surpassing other merchant traders. In 1929, when the Bank of British West Africa opened a branch in Kano, Dantata placed 20 camel-loads of silver coins in it. (For religious reasons, his money collected no interest). Shortly before his death, he pointed to sixty "groundnut pyramids" in Kano and said, "These are all mine".

Dantata applied for a licence to purchase and export groundnuts in 1940, on the same level as the United Africa Company. However, it was not granted because of worldwide military and economic conditions. In 1953–54 he became a licensed buying agent, which allowed him to sell directly to the Nigerian Groundnut Marketing board instead of another firm.

He had many business connections both in Nigeria and in other West African countries, particularly the Gold Coast. He dealt not only in groundnuts and kola but also in other merchandise. He traded in cattle, cloth, beads, precious stones, grains, rope and other things.

Pilgrimage to Mecca
Dantata made a pilgrimage (hajj) to Mecca via boat in the 1920s. On this trip he also went to England and was presented to George V. Dantata financed the pilgrimages of other Muslims to Mecca, a tradition that continues among his descendants. His son, Alhaji Aminu Dantata and his grandchildren like Hajiya Mariya Sunusi Dantata as well as his great-grandchildren, Aliko Dangote still finance pilgrimages of other Muslims to Mecca every year.

Death
In 1955, Dantata fell ill. Because of the seriousness of his illness, he summoned his chief financial controller, Garba Maisikeli and his children. He told them that his days were approaching their end and advised them to live together. He was particularly concerned about the company he had established (Alhassan Dantata & Sons). He asked them not to allow the company to collapse. He implored them to continue to marry within the family as much as possible. He urged them to avoid clashes with other wealthy Kano merchants. They should take care of their relatives, especially the poor among them. Three days later he died in his sleep on Wednesday 17 August 1955. He was buried in his house in the Sarari ward.

Descendants 
Some descendants of Alhassan Dantata includes:
Mahmud Dantata, popularly known as Mamuda Wapa (1922–1983): son. After graduating from Gold Coast University (Ghana) he became his father's chief scribe and Modernized his business activities. He later founded West African Pilgrims Agency in 1948 and pioneered parallel Market Currency Trading in West Africa. The Genius Shrewd Business Man brought more fame to Dantata Family within West African Countries.

Sanusi Dantata (1917-1997): son, a successful businessman
Alhaji Abdulkadir Dantata: Grandson
Aliko Dangote (1957- ): great grandson, a billionaire

Ahmadu Dantata (1916-1960): son, a politician
Aminu Dantata (1931- ): son, a businessman

References

1877 births
1955 deaths
Nigerian Muslims
People from Kano
Hausa people
19th-century Nigerian people
20th-century Nigerian businesspeople
Alhassan
People from colonial Nigeria
Nigerian commodities traders
Nigerian investors
Businesspeople from Kano
Nigerian manufacturing businesspeople
Nigerian chairpersons of corporations
Businesspeople in British Nigeria